Grace Akello (born 1950) is a Ugandan poet, essayist, folklorist, and politician. She is the Uganda Ambassador to India.

Early life and education
Dinah Grace Akello is Iteso, and was born near Soroti, in the Eastern Region of the Uganda Protectorate. She studied Social Administration and Social Work at Makerere University in Kampala. In 1979, she lived in Tanzania after fleeing from Idi Amin's government as a refugee.

Career
She worked as a magazine editor in Kenya and Tanzania before traveling to England in the 1980s to become an assistant editor for the Commonwealth Secretariat. Akello held the position from 1983 to 1990.

Politics
In 1990, Grace Akello went back to Uganda and created a commission to help solve the issue of the displacement and killing of Teso people during Amin's presidency. This commission lasted until 1996. In 1996, she became a member of the Parliament of Uganda, and in 1999 was appointed Minister for Gender, Labour and Social Development.

From 1999 to 2006, She was a member of the Cabinet of Uganda. She held the position of Minister of Microfinance Initiatives from 1999 to 2003, and the Minister of Northern Uganda from 2003 until losing her seat in 2006.
Grace Akello Went on to become the Ugandan ambassador to Italy, based in Rome and recently became the Ugandan ambassador in New Delhi, India, supplying ambassadorial support across the whole Indian subcontinent.

Literature
In 1992, her poem "Encounter" from her collection My Barren Song was included in Margaret Busby's Daughters of Africa, a selection of works from women authors in Africa.

Works
 Iteso Thought Patterns in Tales, 1975
 My Barren Song. Dar es Salaam, Tanzania: Eastern African Publications, 1979
 Self Twice-Removed: Ugandan Woman, London: Change International Reports, 1982

Personal life
Grace Akello married her husband, Hugh Mason, in 1983. They have four sons and have a family home in Uganda close to Kampala .

References

1950 births
Living people
Ugandan women poets
Ugandan women essayists
Folklorists
Ambassadors of Uganda to Italy
Makerere University alumni
People from Soroti District
Members of the Parliament of Uganda
Government ministers of Uganda
20th-century Ugandan poets
20th-century essayists
20th-century Ugandan women writers
21st-century Ugandan poets
21st-century essayists
21st-century Ugandan women writers
20th-century Ugandan women politicians
20th-century Ugandan politicians
21st-century Ugandan women politicians
21st-century Ugandan politicians
Women government ministers of Uganda
Women members of the Parliament of Uganda
Ugandan women ambassadors
Women folklorists